James Clark Haynes (September 22, 1848 – April 14, 1913) was a lawyer and Democratic politician who served as the 22nd and 24th mayor of Minneapolis.

Life and career
Haynes was born in Baldwinsville, New York. He was largely raised on the family's farm. At age 11 he began attending local schools (future Minnesota attorney general Henry W. Childs was a classmate and friend). After graduating, he worked as a teacher for several years while still helping with the family's farm. In 1871, he began college at Onondaga Valley Academy and Cazenovia Seminary. He went on to read law and completed some final studies at Columbia Law School, gaining admission to the bar in 1875. He initially practiced law in Buffalo, New York and Eau Claire, Wisconsin before relocating to Minneapolis in 1878.

After arriving in Minneapolis, Haynes developed a law practice specializing in business law. He was also a backer and president of the American District Telegraph Company of Minneapolis from 1883 to 1906. Haynes also became involved with the local Democratic party. He was elected as an alderman in 1890; in 1892 he was the Democratic nominee for mayor but was defeated. In 1902 he ran again for mayor, winning by a significant margin. Haynes was narrowly defeated in his re-election campaign in 1904, but won again in 1906 as well as 1908 and 1910. As a member of the city council and mayor, Haynes was involved in efforts to create a water reservoir in Columbia Heights, Minnesota, the continuing development of the city's streetcar network, and working to restore public trust and eliminate corruption in the wake of former mayor A. A. Ames.

Haynes died in 1913. He is buried in Lakewood Cemetery in Minneapolis.

Electoral history
Minneapolis Mayoral Election, 1892
William H. Eustis 17,910	
James C. Haynes 15,728		
Charles M. Way 1,842		
Theodore F. Stark 1,665
Minneapolis Mayoral Election, 1902
James C. Haynes 20,345	
Fred M. Powers 14,437
William B. Hammond 704	
Charles D. Raymer 354	
Minneapolis Mayoral Election, 1904
David Percy Jones 18,445
James C. Haynes 18,189		
Milton K. Rogers 2,682		
Charles M. Way 777		
Benjamin Adolphus Frankford 296		
Minneapolis Mayoral Election, 1906
James C. Haynes 21,778
David Percy Jones 18,213		
Milton K. Rogers 1,002		
Minneapolis Mayoral Election, 1908
James C. Haynes 19,814
Charles H. Huhn 19,558
J. D. Engle 1,322
W. L. Beeman 977
Minneapolis Mayoral Election, 1910
James C. Haynes 12,788
W. E. Satterlee 12,754
Thomas Van Lear 11,601
Frank H. Mellen 617

References

1848 births
1913 deaths
Mayors of Minneapolis
Lawyers from Minneapolis
People from Baldwinsville, New York
Minnesota lawyers
Burials at Lakewood Cemetery
19th-century American politicians
American lawyers admitted to the practice of law by reading law
Minneapolis City Council members
19th-century American lawyers